The following is a list of Malayalam films released in 1963.

1963
Lists of 1963 films by country or language
 Mal
 1963
1963 in Indian cinema